Reform School Girls is a 1986 American prison black comedy film, written and directed by Tom DeSimone. It stars Linda Carol, Wendy O. Williams, Pat Ast, Sybil Danning and Sherri Stoner, and depicts the story of a young girl (played by Carol) who is sent to a reform school for girls that is operated by a sadistic and evil warden. She also has to deal with the local bully (Williams).

After directing two other women in prison films, Prison Girls (1972) and The Concrete Jungle (1982), DeSimone decided to make a film that would be a spoof of the genre. The role of Warden Sutter in the original script was a man. Producers wanted Danning to play the character of Edna, but DeSimone thought she wasn't good for that part so he changed the role of Warden Sutter to a woman and had Danning play that role instead.

The film received mostly negative reviews from critics.

Plot
The film is a satire of the women in prison film genre and deliberately implements many of the tropes commonly found in such films. Such scenes include nude shower scenes, fight scenes, and a suggested romantic relationship between one of the inmates and an administrator. The overall plot involves a new influx of girls coming to the school. They are immediately confronted with Charlie Chambliss, who is the de facto leader of the school and has an exceedingly close relationship with the head of the ward, Edna. Charlie runs a secret society of girls who are loyal to her and to whom she offers protection. The two main new girls break several of Edna's rules and are punished decisively for their infractions.

Jenny comes to the school after becoming mixed up in a shoot out. When she and another group of girls arrive, they are forced to strip in front of the prison nurse and then take a shower, while being informed that they will be "inspected inside and out". Afterwards, they are forced to stand naked along a wall while the nurse sprays them with delousing fluid.
 
Jenny later tries to break out after befriending a male driver with whom she has a romantic encounter in the back of his truck. She makes arrangements that he will drive her off the premises but is discovered by a guard and after a scuffle she is apprehended and immediately cast into isolation, where Edna forces her to strip naked before using a firehose to spray her with cold water. Lisa is a runaway who is captured and placed in the reform school, here Jenny is confronted by Charlie and inevitably results in a fight, Jenny is swiftly overwhelmed and left lightly hurt in-front of the other girls, She suffers several losses while at the school including having the cat she adopted stomped to death by Edna. Lisa is punished with isolation. After the death of her cat, Lisa attempts to climb to the top of the tower, followed closely by Edna. When she reaches the top she stumbles backward as Edna confronts her, breaks through the barriers and falls to her death. This causes Jenny to smash through a window, which starts a riot which is only quelled when Warden Sutter shoots a shotgun into the ceiling.

The film culminates in a protest scene after Dr. Norton, a psychiatrist, forces a meeting of administrators over the conditions and treatment of inmates at the school. She intended to have Jenny testify but a doctor determines, despite all evidence to the contrary, that she is ill and will not be able to attend. Therefore, four other inmates are chosen and none of them has any complaints. During the meeting Jenny knocks out a guard and steals her keys, which allows all the girls to march out into the main open area and voice their grudges. Edna, however, gets a hold of a gun and opens fire on them. Edna shoots Charlie and climbs up the tower from which Sutter has broadcast religious-oriented messages as the girls are going to sleep. Charlie climbs a fence and commandeers a school bus, which she drives toward the tower with Edna standing at the top. Just before impact, Charlie leaps from the bus and it explodes as it hits the tower. The scorched body of Edna tumbles to the ground and many of the girls cheer. Charlie crawls and before she dies shouts out, "See you in hell!" to Edna. The final scene shows Jenny released and getting into a cab. She waves at Dr. Norton, who is implied to be in charge of the new, more benevolent order at the school, and three other girls who are still incarcerated.

Cast
Linda Carol as Jenny
Wendy O. Williams as Charlie Chambliss
Pat Ast as Edna
Sybil Danning as Warden Sutter
Charlotte McGinnis as Dr. Norton
Sherri Stoner as Lisa
Denise Gordy as Claudie
Laurie Schwartz as Nicky
Tiffany Helm as Andrea "Fish" Eldridge
Darcy DeMoss as Karen "Knox" Charmin
Andrea Darnell as Paula
Robin Watkins as Kelly
Winifred Freedman as Terri

Production
Tom DeSimone said all of the actresses were well aware that there would be nudity in this movie, particularly shower scenes. "This was all agreed upon before signing on. If you couldn't handle being nude on the set, there was no contract. I didn't want certain girls excluded from being nude out of respect for the ones who were willing. It wouldn't have been fair, so everyone had to agree to be nude at one point or another," he said.

Soundtrack

The soundtrack for the film was released by Rhino Records. It contains four songs by Wendy O. Williams; "It's My Life", "Bad Girl", "Goin' Wild", and the title song "Reform School Girls" recorded for the film.

Reception
Reform School Girls received a negative to mixed critical reception. The film holds a 25% rating on Rotten Tomatoes based on eight reviews.

References

External links
 
 
 

1986 films
1980s crime drama films
1980s comedy thriller films
1980s black comedy films
1980s exploitation films
1980s prison films
American crime drama films
American comedy thriller films
American exploitation films
American prison films
New World Pictures films
Women in prison films
American black comedy films
1986 comedy films
Films directed by Tom DeSimone
1980s English-language films
1980s American films